Ripariosida is a genus of flowering plants belonging to the family Malvaceae.

Its native range is Southeastern Canada to Eastern USA.

Species:
 Ripariosida hermaphrodita (L.) Weakley & D.B.Poind.

References

Malvaceae
Malvaceae genera